Amanda Township, Ohio may refer to:

Amanda Township, Allen County, Ohio
Amanda Township, Fairfield County, Ohio
Amanda Township, Hancock County, Ohio

Ohio township disambiguation pages